Stenoterommata is a genus of South American araneomorph spiders in the family Pycnothelidae. It was first described by E. L. Holmberg in 1881. Originally placed with the Ctenizidae, it was transferred to the funnel-web trapdoor spiders in 1985, then to the Pycnothelidae in 2020. It is a senior synonym of Ctenochelus.

The name is a Latinized form of the Ancient Greek "", referring to posterior eyes that are narrower than any other species in Argentina.

Species
 it contains 26 species, found in Argentina, Uruguay, and Brazil:
Stenoterommata arnolisei Indicatti, Lucas, Ott & Brescovit, 2008 – Brazil
Stenoterommata bodoquena Ghirotto & Indicatti, 2021 – Brazil
Stenoterommata chavarii Ghirotto & Indicatti, 2021 – Brazil
Stenoterommata crassimana (Mello-Leitão, 1923) – Brazil
Stenoterommata crassistyla Goloboff, 1995 – Uruguay, Argentina
Stenoterommata curiy Indicatti, Lucas, Ott & Brescovit, 2008 – Brazil
Stenoterommata egric Ghirotto & Indicatti, 2021 – Brazil
Stenoterommata grimpa Indicatti, Lucas, Ott & Brescovit, 2008 – Brazil
Stenoterommata gugai Indicatti, Chavari, Zucatelli-Júnior, Lucas & Brescovit, 2017 – Brazil
Stenoterommata iguazu Goloboff, 1995 – Argentina
Stenoterommata isa (Nicoletta, Panchuk, Peralta-Seen & Ferretti, 2022) – Argentina
Stenoterommata leporina (Simon, 1891) – Brazil
Stenoterommata leticiae Indicatti, Chavari, Zucatelli-Júnior, Lucas & Brescovit, 2017 – Brazil
Stenoterommata luederwaldti (Mello-Leitão, 1923) – Brazil
Stenoterommata maculata (Bertkau, 1880) – Brazil
Stenoterommata melloleitaoi Guadanucci & Indicatti, 2004 – Brazil
Stenoterommata neodiplornata Ghirotto & Indicatti, 2021 – Brazil
Stenoterommata palmar Goloboff, 1995 – Brazil, Argentina
Stenoterommata pavesii Indicatti, Chavari, Zucatelli-Júnior, Lucas & Brescovit, 2017 – Brazil
Stenoterommata peri Indicatti, Chavari, Zucatelli-Júnior, Lucas & Brescovit, 2017 – Brazil
Stenoterommata pescador Indicatti, Chavari, Zucatelli-Júnior, Lucas & Brescovit, 2017 – Brazil
Stenoterommata platensis Holmberg, 1881 (type) – Argentina
Stenoterommata quena Goloboff, 1995 – Argentina
Stenoterommata sevegnaniae Indicatti, Chavari, Zucatelli-Júnior, Lucas & Brescovit, 2017 – Brazil
Stenoterommata tenuistyla Goloboff, 1995 – Argentina
Stenoterommata uruguai Goloboff, 1995 – Argentina

Formerly included:
S. gounellei Simon, 1886 (Transferred to Acanthogonatus)
S. guttulata Simon, 1886 (Transferred to Acanthogonatus)
S. segne Simon, 1886 (Transferred to Acanthogonatus)

See also
 List of Pycnothelidae species

References

Further reading

Araneomorphae genera
Pycnothelidae
Spiders of South America